Virbia satara is a moth in the family Erebidae first described by Adalbert Seitz in 1919. It is found in Bolivia.

References

satara
Moths described in 1919